Aethesia is an extinct skink (family Scincidae) possibly related to the extant genus Tiliqua, blue-tongued skinks. It is known from the Wellington Caves of New South Wales in Australia. The holotype is the anterior portion of the left mandible, from the symphysis to the splenial bone and containing portions of the coronoid. Teeth number 9 to 15 are intact, with the eighth being a partial tooth and none of the other remaining past the mandible. The teeth slightly enlarge from anterior to posterior.

References

Prehistoric reptiles of Australia
Fossil taxa described in 2009
Skinks of Australia